Eleana Yu (born November 8, 2004) is an American tennis player. Yu has a career-high WTA singles ranking of No. 646 achieved on January 9, 2023, and a career-high doubles ranking of 935, achieved on April 11, 2022.

Career

2022: Grand Slam debut
At just 16-years-old, Yu won the USTA Girls 18s National Championships defeating Valerie Glozman 6-3, 7-5. This earned her a wildcard into the main draw of the 2022 US Open.

Explanatory notes

References

External links
 
 

2004 births
Living people
American female tennis players
Sportspeople from Ohio
Tennis people from Ohio